Carl Wachtmeister may refer to:

 Carl Johan Wachtmeister (1903–1993), Swedish fencer
 Carl Wachtmeister (footballer) (born 1989), Swedish footballer